Criorhina kincaidi is a species of hoverfly in the family Syrphidae.

Distribution
Canada, United States.

References

Eristalinae
Insects described in 1901
Diptera of North America
Hoverflies of North America
Taxa named by Daniel William Coquillett